The Amboy Dukes were an American rock band formed in 1964 in Chicago, Illinois, and later based in Detroit, Michigan. They are best known for their only hit single, "Journey to the Center of the Mind". The band's name comes from the title of a novel by Irving Shulman. In the UK, the group's records were released under the name of the American Amboy Dukes, because of the existence of a British group with the same name.  The band went through a number of personnel changes during its active years, the only constant being lead guitarist and composer Ted Nugent. The band transitioned to being Nugent's backing band before he discontinued the name in 1975.

The Amboy Dukes' primary genres were psychedelic rock, acid rock, and hard rock.

Origins
Ted Nugent, the nucleus of the Amboy Dukes, was born and raised in Detroit and started performing in 1958 at age 10. He played in a group called the Royal High Boys from 1960 to 1962 and later in group named the Lourds, where he first met future Amboy Dukes lead vocalist John Drake. Nugent played with the Lourds until his family moved to Illinois, where he founded the Amboy Dukes in the Chicago area in 1964, playing at The Cellar, in the Chicago suburb of Arlington Heights, among other venues. They later relocated back to Nugent's hometown of Detroit. The members included the following:

Ted Nugent (lead guitar)
Bob Lehnert (vocalist) – who released a single "Better Than Today" with the band Acrobat in 1972
Gary Hicks (guitar, vocals)
Dick Treat (bass, vocals)
Gail Uptadale (drums)

The original lineup did not release any recordings. Nugent's early guitar playing style with his signature Gibson Byrdland positioned high on his chest became an iconic playing style that visually distinguished him from other players. He combined this with his natural virtuosity and frenzied playing style on lead, adding sonic distinction to his unusual visual approach. This gave him an edge as a performance artist. Nugent's appreciation for his guitar inspired him to compose the song "Flight of the Byrd", which was released as a single and as part of their most popular album, Journey to the Center of the Mind.

Band line-ups
Band member line-ups credited on official studio albums:
(Others who may have appeared at live dates between albums are not listed, with the exception of the 1972 band)

1967
After a member shuffle for signing a deal with Mainstream Records of New York City, the personnel on their debut album, The Amboy Dukes, were:

Ted Nugent – lead guitar, vocals
John Drake – vocals; ex-The Lourds
Steve Farmer – guitar, vocals; ex-The Gang
Dave Palmer – drums; ex-The Galaxy Five, ex-The Citations
Rick Lober – keyboards
Bill White – bass, vocals

1968
Journey to the Center of the Mind replaced Lober on keyboards and White on bass:

Ted Nugent – lead guitar, vocals
John Drake – vocals
Steve Farmer – guitar, vocals
Dave Palmer – drums
Andy Solomon – organ, piano, vocals; ex-The Apostles
Greg Arama – bass; ex-The Gang

1969
Migration had Drake replaced on vocals:

Ted Nugent – lead guitar, vocals
Steve Farmer – guitar, vocals
Dave Palmer – drums
Andy Solomon – keyboards, sax, vocals
Greg Arama – bass
Rusty Day – vocals, harmonica; pre-Cactus

1970
Marriage on the Rocks/Rock Bottom dropped Farmer and Day:

Ted Nugent – lead guitar, vocals
Dave Palmer – drums
Andy Solomon – keyboards, vocals
Greg Arama – bass

1971
Survival of the Fittest Live dropped Palmer and Arama. As the sole original member, Nugent changed the bandname to Ted Nugent and the Amboy Dukes:

Ted Nugent – lead guitar, vocals
Andy Solomon – keyboards, vocals
K.J. Knight – drums, vocals; ex-The Day & Night Dealers Blues Band
Rob Ruzga – bass; ex-The Day & Night Dealers Blues Band

1972
In 1972, the band had no record contract. There were two lineups:

Early summer:
Ted Nugent – lead guitar, vocals
Dave Gilbert – lead vocals
Bill White – bass
Keith Johnstone – drums

Late summer:
Ted Nugent – lead guitar, vocals
John Angelos – lead vocals, harmonica
Rob Grange – bass
Joe Vitale – drums, piano, flute
This group recorded some demos at Criteria Studios in Florida, which were never released.

1973
Call of the Wild saw another line-up:

Ted Nugent – lead guitar, percussion, vocals
Rob Grange – bass, vocals, arrangements, composer
Vic Mastrianni – drums, vocals
Andy Jezowski – vocals
Gabriel Magno – flute, keyboards

1974
Tooth Fang & Claw was the group's final lineup, dropping Magno:

Ted Nugent – lead guitar, percussion, vocals
Rob Grange – bass, vocals, arrangements, composer
Vic Mastrianni – drums, percussion, vocals
Andy Jezowski – vocals

Liner notes also credited “Rev. Atrocious Theodosius,”  a fictitious name, on guitar and vocals.

Timeline

Later happenings
Nugent went on to have a successful solo career in the 1970s and joined the Damn Yankees supergroup in the late 1980s. Since the 2000s, Nugent (although continuing his rock career) has been a prominent activist, both for hunting and for conservative politics.

Vocalist Rusty Day joined the Detroit Wheels, replacing Mitch Ryder as lead vocalist. Under Day, that band was renamed Detroit; it disbanded in 1974. He then returned to his previous band, Cactus, in 1976, playing with them until 1979. He turned down offers to front AC/DC and Lynyrd Skynyrd after the deaths of those bands' respective lead singers. Day was shot dead in 1982.

Bassist Greg Arama died in a motorcycle accident on September 18, 1979.

Steve Farmer later taught in Redford Township, Michigan. He also performed with backing bands at various venues in and around the Detroit area.  Farmer died on April 7, 2020, aged 71.

Rick Lober is a classically trained composer best known in the greater Detroit metro area for his frenetic style of keyboard playing. Since the early 1990s, he has been in and out of the studio, appearing as performer/songwriter on the Steve Farmer CD Journey to the Darkside of the Mind (Saint Thomas Records, STP0069) completed in 2000. He is currently working in the studio and performing live with local Detroit rock legend Jeffrey Faust and his band The Woodsman, which performs throughout Michigan and Canada.

In 2008, the Amboy Dukes were inducted into the Michigan Rock and Roll Legends Hall of Fame. The original Amboy Dukes (featuring Nugent, Drake, Farmer, Lober, Solomon and White) performed on April 17, 2009, at the Detroit Music Awards at The Fillmore Detroit. Their performance began with the song "Baby Please Don't Go", from their 1967 debut single. This was followed by "Journey to the Center of the Mind", and ending with Mitch Ryder's "Jenny Take A Ride" (featuring original Ryder drummer Johnny "Bee" Badanjek).  In recognition of the band's contribution to rock music history, they received a Distinguished Achievement award. As the band left the stage, Nugent thanked all his fellow band members and told the crowd "And everyone knows that The Amboy Dukes are the ultimate garage band on planet earth".

Lead singer John Drake died on August 29, 2021, aged 74.

Discography

Albums

Singles

Other releases
The Best of the Original Amboy Dukes - released after The Amboy Dukes left Mainstream Records (Mainstream S/6125) in 1969, failed to chart.
Journeys and Migrations - Mainstream compilation double LP with songs from the first 3 Amboy Dukes albums on Mainstream Records (Mainstream 801 - 2 Record Set) in 1973. (no doubles with the Dr. Slingshot compilation)
Dr. Slingshot - Mainstream compilation with songs from the 1st and 3rd Amboy Dukes albums on Mainstream Records (Mainstream 414) in 1974. (no doubles with the Journeys and Migrations compilation)
Ted Nugent & The Amboy Dukes, Mainstream compilation (Mainstream 421) from 1976. (First original cover has photo of Ted with snakes for his hair. Second 1982 (reissue) cover shows Ted playing a guitar on stage).
Journey To The Darkside of The Mind, released in 2000, saw a rebirth of The Amboy Dukes by Steve Farmer and original keyboardist Rick Lober, sans Ted Nugent (Saint Thomas Records STP 0069) - didn't chart.
Two early songs featuring Drake on lead vocals and composition by Farmer/Nugent have been released as bonus tracks on various compact disc releases. They are titled "J.B. Special" and "Sobbin' In My Mug of Beer" and show the high energy of the first group that recorded as The Amboy Dukes. There are two different versions of "J.B. Special"; a shorter version clocking around 2:21 is quicker tempo with additional lyrics and is titled "alternate version". A more polished and slower tempo version clocks in around 2:33. It was recorded as a follow-up single to their first album but not released at the time. "Sobbin' In My Mug of Beer" is a record-label audition predating the first album sessions.

References

External links
classicbands.com
Motorcitymusicarchives.com
The recording of Survival of the fittest
The Amboy Dukes at Chrome Oxide
Music from Ash vs Evil Dead S1E01
 
 

1964 establishments in Illinois
1975 disestablishments in the United States
Acid rock music groups
Hard rock musical groups from Michigan
Musical groups established in 1964
Musical groups disestablished in 1975
Musical groups from Detroit
Mainstream Records artists
Ted Nugent
Psychedelic rock music groups from Michigan